The Atkinson People is a 1979 BBC radio comedy series. The series, which was first broadcast sporadically in 1979 by the BBC's arts radio station Radio 3, features a satirical profile of a fictional famous person each week.

It is notable as being the first radio or television programme to star comedian and actor Rowan Atkinson. The programme was co-written by Atkinson and Richard Curtis and produced by future Not the Nine O'Clock News co-star Griff Rhys Jones, then a BBC Radio Comedy producer. In most cases, Atkinson played the lead characters, with other voices provided by Hugh Thomas and Peter Wilson. Following the precedent set by The Hitchhiker's Guide to the Galaxy, the series was also an early adopter of stereophonic sound; it was recorded in 1978, and broadcast in 1979. The series has been repeated on BBC Radio 7 and its successor BBC Radio 4 Extra, and was picked by Armando Iannucci during his stint as "comedy controller".

Episodes

References

BBC Radio comedy programmes
BBC Radio 3 programmes
Works by Rowan Atkinson